The Alexander Nevsky Cathedral is a Russian Orthodox cathedral church located in the Kanavinsky city district of Nizhny Novgorod. The cathedral is located on the former territory of the Nizhny Novgorod Fair. It is one of the unofficial symbols of Nizhny Novgorod, along with the Dmitrovskaya Tower of the Kremlin, the Chkalov staircase and the fair.

The main construction of the cathedral was begun on August 18, 1868 and lasted for 13 years, internal work continued until 1881. July 20, 1881 it was solemnly consecrated in the presence of Emperor Alexander III, his wife Maria Feodorovna and Tsarevich Nicholas. The height of the temple is 87 meters (3425.2 inches).

The closest metro station is Strelka .

History

Russian Empire 
In 1856 the merchants decided to build a new Orthodox cathedral in memory of the visit of the fair by Emperor Alexander II. They turned to the request for the construction of a new cathedral to Bishop Anthony and Governor A. Muraviov. A collection of donations was made. The required funds (454,667 rubles 28 kopecks) were recruited over 10 years (by 1866). September 8, 1864, was lay the foundation stone of the future temple. By 1864 the project of the architect Robert Kilevain was ready. The project had to be remade due to the insufficient strength of the cathedral. Then it turned out that there was not enough funding for this. A new project, proposed by the young architect Lev Dahl, was also not approved.

November 18, 1865, the temple project was approved by the government. His authorship is still not exactly established. In 1866 Lev Dahl returned to Nizhny Novgorod from abroad and finalized the project.

September 15, 1867 was established by the construction committee for the construction of the temple, and August 11, 1868, was re-laying the cathedral on the Strelka (Spit). The main construction of the cathedral was begun on August 18, 1868 and lasted for 13 years, the interior works continued until 1881. The cathedral was built without a pile foundation and "it was a centric monumental building with five octagonal tents, a central tent 72.5 meters high. In the decoration of the facade elements of different architectural styles were combined. The plan of the cathedral was eclectic in character." In the cathedral were transported icons from the liquidated Makaryev monastery, which suffered from a fire.

Soviet period 
In 1929, the temple was closed, valuables were seized. In the winter of 1930, according to the decision of the leadership of the Volga Flotilla, the iconostases and all the wooden ornaments of the cathedral were broken up for firewood to heat the city's houses. However, parishioners managed to save several icons, including the icon of the Mother of God and the Life-Creating Cross.

In the late 1920s, a project for the reconstruction of the fairground was developed. It was planned to dismantle the cathedral and build a lighthouse with a monument to Lenin in this place. This project was not carried out, but in the late 1930s, the tents on the roof of the cathedral were dismantled. Later, the building of the cathedral was converted for storage and housing. Numerous auxiliary rooms and various offices were added to the cathedral. In the basement of the temple were warehouses. In the 1940s there was a fire that destroyed the interior of the building. Afterwards, the remnants of the inner plaster were completely ripped off.

During World War II, an anti-aircraft battery was installed on the site of the central tent of the cathedral, which defended the Gorky city (the name of Nizhny Novgorod in the Soviet era) from the Luftwaffe air raids.

In 1983, the restoration of the cathedral began, during this period, voluntary restorers took an active part. In 1989, the restoration of the broken tent roofs of the cathedral began. In February 1991, the Brotherhood of St. Alexander Nevsky was established. And in June 1992 the cathedral was returned to the Russian Orthodox Church. On September 12, 2009, the cathedral was given the status of a cathedral (main).

Bell "Cathedral" 
The installation of the bell in honor of the 400th anniversary of the Nizhny Novgorod militia of Kuzma Minin and Prince Dmitry Pozharsky was planned at the confluence of the Oka and Volga rivers, 300 meters from the Alexander Nevsky Cathedral. Until this time, the bell is placed on the temporary belfry at the southern entrance to the cathedral.
The project of creating the bell was implemented with the blessing of Patriarch of Moscow and All Russia Alexy II. This is the third largest bell in Russia (after the Tsar Bell in Moscow and the bell in the Trinity-Sergius Lavra). Its height and diameter are the same and equal to 4 meters. Weight 60 tons. Made of bell bronze (80% copper and 20% tin). On the lower belt of the bell there is an inscription perpetuating the names of all trustees and benefactors who took part in its creation.

Gallery

References

1881 establishments in the Russian Empire
Religious organizations established in 1881
Russian Orthodox cathedrals in Russia
Nizhny Novgorod
Churches in Nizhny Novgorod
Cultural heritage monuments of federal significance in Nizhny Novgorod Oblast
Churches completed in 1881